Anachis miser is a species of sea snail in the family Columbellidae, the dove snails.

Description
The length of the shell attains 16 mm.

Distribution
This marine species occurs off India, the Eastern Indian Ocean, in the Pacific Ocean off Hawaii, Oceania and off Australia (Northern Territory, Queensland, Western Australia).

References

 Sowerby, G.B. (2nd) 1844. Monograph of the genus Columbella. 109–146, pls 36–40 in Thesaurus Conchyliorum or monographs of genera of shells. London : Sowerby Vol. 1.
 Smith, E.A. 1879. On a collection of marine shells from the Andaman Islands. Proceedings of the Zoological Society of London 1878: 804–821, pl. 50 
 Hedley, C. 1915. Studies on Australian Mollusca. Part XII. Proceedings of the Linnean Society of New South Wales 39: 695–755, pls 77-85 
 Wilson, B. 1994. Australian Marine Shells. Prosobranch Gastropods. Kallaroo, WA : Odyssey Publishing Vol. 2 370 pp.
 Severns, M. (2011). Shells of the Hawaiian Islands - The Sea Shells. Conchbooks, Hackenheim. 564 pp.

External links
 

miser
Gastropods described in 1844